The San Diego Museum of Art is a fine arts museum located at 1450 El Prado in Balboa Park in San Diego, California that houses a broad collection with particular strength in Spanish art.  The San Diego Museum of Art opened as The Fine Arts Gallery of San Diego on February 28, 1926, and changed its name to the San Diego Museum of Art in 1978.  The official Balboa Park website calls the San Diego Museum of Art "the region's oldest and largest art museum".  Nearly half a million people visit the museum each year.

Structure
The museum building was designed by architects William Templeton Johnson and Robert W. Snyder in a plateresque style to harmonize with existing structures from the Panama–California Exposition of 1915.  The dominant feature of the façade is a heavily ornamented door inspired by a doorway at the University of Salamanca.  The Cathedral of Valladolid also influenced the museum's exterior design, and the architects derived interior motifs from the Santa Cruz Hospital of Toledo, Spain.  The original construction took two years.  Sponsor Appleton S. Bridges donated the building to the City of San Diego upon its completion.  In 1966 the museum added a west wing and a sculpture court which doubled its size, and an east wing in 1974 further increased its exhibition space.  Plans are underway for a renovation to the rotunda, sculpture garden, façade, auditorium, and other features.

Collections
The Museum's collections are encyclopedic in nature, with pieces ranging in date from 5000 BC to 2012 AD.  The museum's strength is in Spanish works by Murillo, Zurbarán, Cotán, Ribera and El Greco.  Much of the museum's old master collection was donated by sisters Anne, Amy, and Irene Putnam.  The museum's first major acquisition was the 1939 purchase of Francisco Goya's El Marques de Sofraga, which had belonged to a private family collection until that time and had never before been on public exhibition.  The Putnam sisters provided financial backing for the purchase.  The following year, director Reginald Poland acquired a portrait by Giovanni Bellini for the museum's collection.  Then in 1941 the museum purchased a Diego Velázquez portrait of the Infanta Margarita of Spain, which was possibly a study for a larger portrait of her in Vienna.  Other major benefactors during the museum's first quarter century were Archer M. Huntington and Mr. and Mrs. Henry Timken, whose small art collection is housed in the nearby Timken Museum of Art, established in 1965. In 2012, the Museum of Art received 48 German Expressionist paintings, drawings and prints from a range of artists, including Otto Dix, Egon Schiele, Alexej von Jawlensky, Gabriele Münter and Gustav Klimt from the collection of Vance E. Kondon and his wife Elisabeth Giesberger.

The museum houses works by Italian masters Giorgione, Giambattista Pittoni, Giotto, Veronese, Luini and Canaletto.  Works by Rubens, Hals and van Dyck represent the Northern European School.  The museum regularly hosts touring exhibits and has lately been working to display its standard collection in new ways, including an upstairs gallery discussing information which can be gathered by looking on the back of the canvas. The exhibition is complemented with a large collection of images, including portraits, Arnold Newman's work, and Mexican landscapes from the early twentieth century.

Collection highlights

Special exhibitions
Important special exhibitions that the museum has hosted include The Precious Legacy (1984).

Contemporary art programming

In 2010, The San Diego Museum of Art in conjunction with the Agitprop gallery created The Summer Salon Series. The program, curated by Alexander Jarman and David White, featured local emerging artists who presented and performed temporary art works and workshops in direct response to the Toulouse-Lautrec exhibition. Each of the ten presentations involved Contemporary Artists' responses to the Modern Art on display in the museum.

Special events
Each April since 1981 the Museum hosts its major fundraiser, "Art Alive". Floral designers use flowers and other organic materials to express their interpretation of a work of art from the Museum's permanent collection. For four days the resulting creations are displayed next to the art work that inspired them. The museum also hosts events such as "Art after Hours" and "Culture and Cocktails", which encourage attendees to sample the collection into the evening during extended opening hours or partake in social events centered in the gallery.

References

External links

 San Diego Museum of Art website
 Summer Salon Series, 2010

 
1926 establishments in California
Art museums established in 1926
Art museums and galleries in California
Asian art museums in California
Museums in San Diego
Spanish Colonial Revival architecture in California
Balboa Park (San Diego)